is a village located in Ibaraki Prefecture, Japan. , the village had an estimated population of 37,651 in 15,148 households and a population density of 991 persons per km2. The percentage of the population aged over 65 was 25.8%. The Japan Atomic Energy Agency along with other organizations currently operate a number of nuclear technology research facilities in the town. In particular, Tōkai Nuclear Power Plant is located in Tōkai.

Geography
The village is about 15 kilometers northeast of the prefectural capital of Mito. with the Kuji River to the north. The area is located at the northern end of the Hitachi Plateau, and consists of lowlands which are alluvium and covered with rice paddy fields, and the plateau is diluvial, with upland fields and flatland forests.

Surrounding municipalities
Ibaraki Prefecture
 Hitachi
 Naka
Hitachinaka

Demographics
Per Japanese census data, the population of Tōkai has grown steadily over the last century.

History
The villages of Muramatsu and Ishigami were created with the establishment of the modern municipalities system on April 1, 1889. On March 31, 1955, the two villages merged to form the village of Tōkai. In 1956, Japan Atomic Energy Research Institute was established at Tōkai. After JRR-1, the first nuclear reactor in Japan, reached criticality, many nuclear-related facilities such as Japan Atomic Energy Agency, Japan Atomic Power Company Tokai Power Station and Tokai No. 2 Power Station have been concentrated in the village, which became the base of the Japanese nuclear industry. The village was the site of the Tokaimura nuclear accident which occurred at the JCO nuclear reprocessing plant on 30 September 1999, which killed two people.

Government
Tōkai has a mayor-council form of government with a directly elected mayor and a unicameral village council of 18 members. Tōkai contributes one member to the Ibaraki Prefectural Assembly. In terms of national politics, the village is part of Ibaraki 5th district of the lower house of the Diet of Japan.

Economy
The nuclear power industry, together with associated government and private research facilities (including the J-PARC particle physics laboratory), and government subventions form the basis of the local economy.

Education
Tōkai has six public elementary schools and two public middle schools operated by the village government, and one public high school operated by the Ibaraki Prefectural Board of Education. In addition, the University of Tokyo and the Graduate University for Advanced Studies have research facilities located at Tōkai.

Transportation

Railway
 JR East – Jōban Line

Highway
  – Tōkai Interchange

Seaports
Port of Ibaraki

International relations
  Idaho Falls, Idaho, United States of America.

Noted people
Masaru Hashimoto, politician
Teruaki Kobayashi, professional soccer player

References

External links

Official Website 

Villages in Ibaraki Prefecture
Port settlements in Japan
Populated coastal places in Japan
Nuclear technology in Japan
Tōkai, Ibaraki